William Lang was an American college football coach. He served as the head football coach at Maryland Agricultural College—now known as the University of Maryland, College Park—from 1908 to 1909, compiling record of 5–13. Lang co-coached the team with Edward Larkin in 1909. Lang was an alumnus of the  University of Delaware.

Head coaching record

References

Year of birth missing
Year of death missing
Maryland Terrapins football coaches